Andrew Austin Hawkins (born March 10, 1986) is a former American football wide receiver. He played six seasons in the National Football League with the Cincinnati Bengals and Cleveland Browns and two seasons for the Montreal Alouettes of the Canadian Football League, where he was part of back-to-back Grey Cup Championships. He had signed with the New England Patriots in the 2017 offseason, but announced his retirement just days before training camp. He played college football for the Toledo Rockets from 2004 to 2007.

Early career 
Hawkins attended Bishop McCort High School in his hometown of Johnstown, Pennsylvania, where he played football and ran track. In football, he played as a running back and had 562 yards rushing and 10 touchdowns as a senior. He was named second-team All-state as a defensive back by PA Football News and Associated Press, and All-conference as a running back. In track & field, Hawkins competed in sprinting and jumping events. In sprints, he recorded a personal-best time of 11.33 seconds in the 100 meters, and was a member of the 4 × 100 m relay squad. He also participated in long jump (20 ft 2 in) and triple jump (41 ft 8 in).

Hawkins chose to attend college at the University of Toledo in Toledo, Ohio. He played at wide receiver and cornerback, making him the first Rocket to play both ways in 48 years.  Over four seasons, he played in 37 games, starting in 25. He finished his career with 67 receptions for 1,107 yards and five touchdowns. As a cornerback, he had two forced fumbles, one blocked punt and 21 tackles.

Professional career 

Hawkins worked out with the Cleveland Browns after going undrafted in the 2008 NFL draft. He was not signed to play in the NFL and was out of football the entire 2008 season.

4th and Long
Hawkins competed as a contestant on Michael Irvin's football reality show 4th and Long. Hawkins was a runner-up to fellow receiver Jesse Holley. Hawkins was cut on the final episode along with future CFL player Ahmaad Smith.

Montreal Alouettes
He then signed with the Montreal Alouettes of the Canadian Football League (CFL) on December 5, 2008.

However, before his first CFL season in 2009, Hawkins went to compete on Michael Irvin's football reality show 4th and Long to compete for a spot on the Dallas Cowboys roster. He was named the runner-up.

Hawkins then went on to play with the Alouettes for two seasons. He scored his first CFL touchdown on October 12, 2009 during a Thanksgiving Day match-up against the Calgary Stampeders. He totaled only 41 receptions, 457 yards and five touchdowns in two seasons for the Alouettes, but was a part of the back-to-back Grey Cup championship teams.

St. Louis Rams
On January 12, 2011, Hawkins signed a contract with the St. Louis Rams of the National Football League (NFL). He was waived on August 1, 2011.

Cincinnati Bengals

The Cincinnati Bengals claimed Hawkins off waivers on August 1, 2011. He debuted for the team on August 21, 2011 in Week 2 of the preseason against New York Jets, catching a 15-yard pass from Dan LeFevour. Hawkins was waived during final-day cuts on September 3 but he was re-signed to the team's practice squad the following day. Hawkins was added to the active roster after Jordan Shipley was placed on injured reserve.

Hawkins went on to record 23 receptions for 263 yards, both fifth among the team's receivers. He also had five rushes for 25 yards converted on nine third-down situations. His on-the-field performance made Hawkins a bit of a "fan favorite" among Bengals fans, who referred to him as "Baby Hawk".

He had a breakout season in 2012 for the Bengals, playing in 14 games and totaling 51 receptions for 533 yards and four touchdowns, plus six rushes for 30 yards.

In 2013, he suffered a serious ankle injury prior to the preseason and was placed on injured reserve with a designation for a possible return, meaning he could return and play by Week 9. He did return and played in the Bengals final eight games, totaling 12 receptions for 199 yards.

Cleveland Browns
Hawkins signed an offer sheet with the Cleveland Browns on March 12, 2014. The Bengals had until March 18 to match or the offer sheet would become an official contract. The Bengals declined to match the offer, and Hawkins became a member of the Browns with a reported four-year, $13.6 million contract, including a $3.8 million signing bonus. In his first season in Cleveland, Hawkins led the Browns with 63 catches for 824 yards and two touchdowns. On December 23, 2015, the Browns placed him on injured reserve.

On February 27, 2017, Hawkins was released by the Browns.

New England Patriots 
On May 24, 2017, Hawkins signed a one-year contract with the New England Patriots.

Retirement 
On July 25, 2017, Hawkins announced his retirement from the NFL.

Statistics

NFL

all stats from espn.com

CFL

Personal life 
Hawkins is the younger brother of former NFL cornerback Artrell Hawkins. He is also the cousin of retired CFL slotback Geroy Simon, and former NFL offensive guard Carlton Haselrig.

Hawkins is a Christian. Hawkins has spoken about his faith saying, "I literally thank God every day for what I'm doing right now. I wouldn't change the way I got here at all. It taught me so much. It made me a better person and a better man. I'm just so thankful for where I am, and I wake up every day and thank God for it."

Hawkins graduated from Columbia University in 2017 with a master's degree in sports management from the School of Professional Studies with a 4.0 GPA.

Film and television career
Hawkins appears as an extra in the George Clooney film, The Ides of March.

Hawkins is now a host on SportsCenter on Snapchat. In addition to this Hawkins co-hosts a football based podcast called the Thom & Hawk Football Show with his former teammate from the Browns, Joe Thomas.

Hawkins hosts Discovery Channel's reality competition TV show Dodgeball Thunderdome along with YouTube star David Dobrik and Erin Lim.

Hawkins cohosts variety program "Roku Recommends" with actress Maria Menounos which premiered July 2021

References

External links 

 Toledo Rockets bio
 Cincinnati Bengals bio
 Cleveland Browns bio
 

1986 births
Living people
Sportspeople from Johnstown, Pennsylvania
Players of American football from Pennsylvania
African-American players of American football
African-American players of Canadian football
American football wide receivers
Canadian football wide receivers
Toledo Rockets football players
Montreal Alouettes players
St. Louis Rams players
Cincinnati Bengals players
Cleveland Browns players
New England Patriots players
21st-century African-American sportspeople
20th-century African-American people